State Trunk Highway 13 (often called Highway 13, STH-13 or WIS 13) is a state highway running north–south across northwest and central Wisconsin. WIS 13 serves as a major north–south route connecting the communities of Wisconsin Dells, Wisconsin Rapids, Marshfield and Ashland. WIS 13 is part of the Lake Superior Circle Tour from its northern/western terminus to Ashland at is eastern junction with U.S. Highway 2 (US 2). The road also provides access to the Apostle Islands National Lakeshore off the Lake Superior shoreline at Bayfield. The highway is two-lane surface road with the exception of various urban multilane road sections.

Route description

Wisconsin Dells to Marshfield 

WIS 13 begins at Interstate 90/Interstate 94 (I-90/I-94) and passes east through Wisconsin Dells as an urban multilane highway, crossing US 12 and merging with WIS 16 and WIS 23 east through the city. WIS 13 then turns north, while WIS 23 heads east and WIS 16 heads south one mile (1.6 km) east of the city. WIS 13 follows the Wisconsin River north through Adams County, passing through Plainville, Adams and Friendship.

WIS 13 joins WIS 54 south at the Riverview Expressway, a short bypass of the downtown area. There, WIS 13 turns to follow US 10 west toward Marshfield, following the US 10 expressway bypassing Milladore, Blenker, and Auburndale. At exit 186 (CTH-A/Veterans Parkway) on the south side of Marshfield, WIS 13 exits the US 10 expressway to head north into Marshfield on Veterans Parkway. WIS 13 enters Marathon County after passing through Marshfield.

The four-lane road in Marshfield is also known as Veterans Parkway. This section was built to alleviate congestion in downtown Marshfield along Central Avenue.

Marshfield to Ashland 

WIS 13 heads northwest to Spencer where it turns north to follow the Marathon–Clark county line, passing through Unity, Colby and Abbotsford (where it junctions with WIS 29) and around Dorchester. The highway then enters Taylor County where it passes through Stetsonville and crosses WIS 64 on the east side of Medford. North of Medford, WIS 13 meanders around Whittlesey, Chelsea and Westboro.

In Price County, WIS 13 reaches the WIS 86 terminus at Ogema and crosses US 8 near Prentice. The highway then turns northwest to Phillips. The route turns north again out of Phillips to head into Fifield where WIS 70 crosses. WIS 13 then meets WIS 182 at its terminus in Park Falls before heading northwest out of the county into Ashland County. WIS 13 passes through Butternut and Glidden upon entering the county.  northwest of Glidden, the highway joins with WIS 77 north, and the two highways head north, passing through Cayuga and split with WIS 77 heading east at Mellen and WIS 13 heading northwest, passing through Highbridge, Minersville and Marengo.

Along the Lake Superior shoreline (Ashland to Superior) 

WIS 13 closely follows the shore of Chequamegon Bay and passes through Barksdale, Washburn and Bayfield. It is at Bayfield where access to Madeline Island and the Apostle Island National Lakeshore is available. WIS 13 turns westward at Red Cliff and follows the shore of Lake Superior, passing through Cornucopia, Herbster, and Port Wing, before entering Douglas County. One mile after the county line, WIS 13 turns southward to parallel the Brule River State Forest for five miles (8 km), then turns west again. The highway ends at US 2 and US 53 southeast of Superior.

History 

With some variation due to realignments over time, the original 1918 routing this highway followed much of today's WIS 13, beginning at what was then Kilbourn (present-day Wisconsin Dells), travelling north through Adams, Grand Rapids (now Wisconsin Rapids), Marshfield, Prentice and Ashland, ending in Bayfield. It was later that STH-13 was routed around the Bayfield Peninsula and westerly to just before Superior. WIS 13 ends in the Town of Parkland at CTH-Z.

The route of WIS 13 previously ran the length of the state from Beloit on the Illinois state line to the Minnesota state line. From Beloit, WIS 13 followed the roads that are now US 51, US 14, US 12 through Janesville and Madison. Additionally, WIS 13 was extended westerly from Bayfield first to Port Wing, then into Superior then across the border to Duluth. In the 1920s, the southern end of WIS 13 was realigned from Evansville to Beloit along what is now WIS 213 after US 14 was commissioned.

WIS 13 was truncated to its present southern terminus in 1961 after I-90 and I-94 were commissioned.

As of late August 2012, WIS 13 was removed as a concurrency with WIS 73 between Wisconsin Rapids and Marshfield. WIS 13 now departs Wisconsin Rapids concurrent with WIS 34 to the new US 10 expressway west of Junction City, and then follows the new US 10 west to Marshfield.

Major intersections

Special routes 
 
Two special routes exist for WIS 13. The first, in Wisconsin Rapids, runs downtown from Riverview Expressway (WIS 13 and WIS 54) along North 8th Street, then west along Avon Street, Jackson Street and West Grand Avenue, ending at the junction of WIS 34, WIS 13 and WIS 73. The second, in Marshfield, follows the old alignment of WIS 13 along Central Avenue through downtown.

See also

References

External links 

 WIS 13/80 Realignment information from WisDOT (PDF document)

013
Lake Superior Circle Tour
Transportation in Sauk County, Wisconsin
Transportation in Columbia County, Wisconsin
Transportation in Adams County, Wisconsin
Transportation in Wood County, Wisconsin
Transportation in Portage County, Wisconsin
Transportation in Marathon County, Wisconsin
Transportation in Clark County, Wisconsin
Transportation in Taylor County, Wisconsin
Transportation in Price County, Wisconsin
Transportation in Ashland County, Wisconsin
Transportation in Bayfield County, Wisconsin
Transportation in Douglas County, Wisconsin